In mathematics, a Ramsey cardinal  is a certain kind of large cardinal number introduced by  and named after Frank P. Ramsey, whose theorem establishes that ω enjoys a certain property that Ramsey cardinals generalize to the uncountable case.

Let [κ]<ω denote the set of all finite subsets of κ. A cardinal number κ  is called Ramsey if, for every function

f: [κ]<ω → {0, 1}

there is a set A of cardinality κ that is homogeneous for f. That is, for every n, the function f is constant on the subsets of cardinality n from A. A cardinal κ is called ineffably Ramsey if A can be chosen to be a stationary subset of κ. A cardinal κ is called virtually Ramsey if for every function

f: [κ]<ω → {0, 1}

there is C, a closed and unbounded subset of κ, so that for every λ in C of uncountable cofinality, there is an unbounded subset of λ that is homogenous for f; slightly weaker is the notion of almost Ramsey where homogenous sets for f are required  of order type λ, for every λ < κ.

The existence of any of these kinds of Ramsey cardinal is sufficient to prove the existence of 0#, or indeed that every set with rank less than κ has a sharp.

Every measurable cardinal is a Ramsey cardinal, and every Ramsey cardinal  is a Rowbottom cardinal.

A property intermediate in strength between Ramseyness and measurability is existence of a κ-complete normal non-principal ideal I on κ such that for every  and for every function

f: [κ]<ω → {0, 1}

there is a set B ⊂ A not in I that is homogeneous for f.   This is strictly stronger than κ being ineffably Ramsey.

The existence of a Ramsey cardinal implies the existence of 0# and this in turn implies the falsity of the Axiom of Constructibility of Kurt Gödel.

References 
 

 

Large cardinals
Ramsey theory